In 1917, the Russian Army formally ceased to be the Imperial Russian Army when the power in Russia was transferred from the Empire to the Provisional Government.

After the February Revolution the systems of command and of supply of the army were  disrupted. The army became tired of World War I.

The revolutionary wave influenced the Army, and it was swept with the processes of democratization and the single line of command was questioned. The Order No. 1 issued by the Petrograd Soviet  instructed soldiers and sailors to obey their officers and the Provisional Government only if their orders did not contradict the decrees of the Petrograd Soviet. The interpretation of the Order, both at the time and by the historians has been a matter of controversy. While many scholars agree that the order severely disrupted the army discipline, John Boyd argued that in fact, the order's intention was to restore the discipline and it clearly stated that it was to be applied only to the troops off the front lines. While the order did not call for the democratic election of the officers, it has been a widespread misinterpretation.

References

Imperial Russian Army
1917 in Russia
Russian Revolution